AP Smith Manufacturing Co. v. Barlow, 13 N.J. 145, 98 A.2d 581 (N.J. 1953), is a US corporate law case, concerning the application of directors' duties in regard to balancing the interests of different stakeholders. It held that directors may make charitable donations, so long as their personal interests do not conflict, or there is a contravention of state law.

Facts

The directors of AP Smith Manufacturing, a New Jersey company making fire hydrants in East Orange, approved donation of $1,500 to Princeton University. The shareholders disapproved of the gift and contended that it was a breach of a director's duty to act in the corporation or shareholder interests. Specifically they argued that there was no express authority in the corporation's certificate of incorporation. A New Jersey statute allowed corporations to make charitable donations, so long as the recipient did not own more than 10 per cent of a corporation's stock, but the shareholders argued this was inapplicable if the corporation was incorporated beforehand.

Judgment
The Court held the gift was within the competence of the company and lauded it as a 'long visioned… action in recognizing and voluntarily discharging its high obligations as a constituent of our modern society.' It continued as follows.

Legacy
Together with the earlier English case of Hutton v West Cork Rly Co (1883) and Australian case of Miles v Sydney Meat-Preserving Co Ltd (1912), AP Smith has been acknowledged as an early instance of legal recognition of corporate social responsibility.

References

External links
 

United States corporate case law
New Jersey state case law
1953 in New Jersey
1953 in United States case law
East Orange, New Jersey
Donation